Zouheir Chokr (alternative spellings: Zouheir Shokr, Zouheir Chokor, Zouheir Shokor, Zouheir Choker, Zouheir Shoker, Zouhair Chokr, Zouhair Chokor, Zouhair Shokor) is the President of the Lebanese University.

Early career
Chokr was born in Bednayel in 1947. He holds a PhD in Political Science from the Université Paul Cézanne Aix-Marseille III (France). After teaching with the Lebanese University, Chokr worked as a Lebanese Ambassador in Qatar.

Medals
Palmes académiques - Officier - France 1993.
Wissam El Istihqaq al Watani - Qatar -1998.

Living people
1947 births
Lebanese diplomats
Ambassadors of Lebanon to Qatar
Academic staff of Lebanese University
Paul Cézanne University alumni